The 1987 VFL season was the West Coast Eagles' inaugural season in the Victorian Football League (VFL). The club was introduced to the competition as part of the VFL's expansion. Ron Alexander was appointed coach of the team and Ross Glendinning was appointed captain. The Eagles played 22 games, winning 11 and losing 11 to finish 8th on the ladder.

List

Squad

Pre-season

National Panasonic Cup
West Coast played their first match against another AFL club during the 1987 National Panasonic Cup, the VFL's night series at the time, defeating  by 29 points at Waverley Park after trailing by 28 points at three-quarter time.

Home team's score listed in bold:

Regular season
Home team's score listed in bold:

Source: AFLTables

Ladder

Awards
Steve Malaxos won the inaugural Club Champion Award, polling 229 votes to finish ahead of Ross Glendinning and Chris Mainwaring:

Glen Bartlett won the award for Best Clubman and Chris Mainwaring was named Rookie of the Year.

References

External links
West Coast Eagles Official Site
Official Site of the Australian Football League

West Coast Eagles
West Coast Eagles seasons